Paul Clayton Vitz (born August 27, 1935) is an American psychologist who is a Senior Scholar at Divine Mercy University in Sterling, Virginia. He is Emeritus Professor of psychology at New York University. His work focuses primarily on the relationship between psychology and Christianity.

Career

Paul Vitz was born on August 27, 1935, in Toledo, Ohio. He moved to Minneapolis, and later to Cincinnati, Ohio, which he considers his hometown. He was raised as a nominal Presbyterian. He graduated Phi Beta Kappa with a BA in psychology from the University of Michigan in 1957 and with a PhD in psychology from Stanford University in 1962.

From 1962 to 1964, Vitz taught at Pomona College. He held a post-doc at Stanford University, from 1964 to 1965. He was hired in the Fall of 1965 as Assistant Professor in the Psychology Department of New York University. He received tenure there in the Fall of 1972. His research was focused on perceptual and cognitive psychology, especially sequential pattern learning and visual form perception and preferred levels of stimulus complexity. Vitz also has an ongoing interest in psychology and art as shown in a co-authored work: "Modern Art and Modern Science: The Parallel Analysis of Vision", 1984. His interest in visual art has also focused on the two brain hemispheres and on a hierarchical model of image construction in visual perception.

His career changed markedly in the mid-seventies with his conversion from atheism to Christianity and later, in 1979, to Catholicism. His first book, "Psychology as Religion: The Cult of Self-Worship", 1977 (2nd ed., 1994), critiqued humanistic psychology (e.g. Rogers, Maslow) for its radical individualism, neglect of interpersonal relationships, and its assumption that self-actualization was the meaning of life for everyone. In the early 1980s Vitz was involved in the national controversy over neglect of religion, especially Christianity in public school textbooks.
He authored "Censorship: Evidence of bias in our children's textbooks", 1984. During this decade he also wrote articles on Christian approaches to the work of Sigmund Freud, resulting in his book "Sigmund Freud's Christian Unconscious", 1988. This book provides much historical and biographical evidence for Freud's deep and lifelong involvement with and ambivalence toward Christianity, especially Catholicism. It also shows that the significance of this concern with Christianity has been widely neglected and ignored by his biographers. Another interest of his at this time was moral development involving a critique of rational/cognitive approaches, e.g. Kohlberg, and an emphasis on stories. See
"The use of stories in moral development: New psychological reasons for an old education method", Amer. Psychologist, 1990. In the 1980s and especially in the 90's his work turned to personality theory and Christianity and to the psychological importance of fathers. The latter culminated in a book on what Vitz claims are the psychological factors which produce atheism, "Faith of the Fatherless: The Psychology of Atheism", 1999 and a 2nd ed. in 2013. He has made basic contributions as an editor to "A Catholic Christian Meta-Model of the Person", 2020 and to "The Complementarity of Women and Men", 2021.  He is presently working on the origin of human consciousness, the relevance of the soul for psychology, and on the consequences of analog and digital coding.

At New York University he was promoted to full Professor and he retired from there in 2003 as Professor Emeritus. He is now Senior Scholar/Professor in the Institute for the Psychological Sciences, Divine Mercy University.

Personal life  
Vitz is married to Evelyn Birge Vitz, a Professor of French at New York University specializing in medieval studies and in the performance of medieval and other narrative works. They had six children and now twenty-three grandchildren.

Publications

Vitz, Paul C. (2017). The origin of consciousness in the integration of analog (right hemisphere) & digital (left hemisphere) codes.  Journal of Consciousness Exploration & Research, 8(11), pp. 881–906. 
Vitz, Paul C., Nordling W. J., & Titus, C.S. (Eds.) (2020).  A Catholic Christian Meta-Model of the Person: Integration with psychology and mental health practice. Sterling, VA: Divine Mercy University Press. (Expanded Reason Award, 2020. Benedict XVI Foundation, Rome.)
Vitz, Paul C. (Ed.) (2021). The complementarity of women and men: Philosophy, theology, psychology and art.  Washington, D.C.: Catholic University of America Press.

See also

 Postmodern psychology

References

1935 births
American male non-fiction writers
20th-century American psychologists
American psychology writers
Converts to Roman Catholicism from atheism or agnosticism
Living people
New York University faculty
Pomona College faculty
Psychologists of religion
Roman Catholic scholars
Stanford University alumni
University of Michigan College of Literature, Science, and the Arts alumni
Writers from Ohio
Freudians